Vince Dillon (2 October 1923 – September 2005) was an English footballer who played as centre forward for Bolton Wanderers, Tranmere Rovers and Truro City. He went on to become player-manager at Truro. He was player-coach at Falmouth Town for the 1955–56 season.

References

Bolton Wanderers F.C. players
Tranmere Rovers F.C. players
Truro City F.C. players
1923 births
2005 deaths
Footballers from Manchester
Association football forwards
English footballers
English Football League players
English football managers
Falmouth Town A.F.C. players
Truro City F.C. managers